Vojtanov is a municipality and village in Cheb District in the Karlovy Vary Region of the Czech Republic. It has about 200 inhabitants.

Administrative parts
Villages and hamlets of Antonínova Výšina, Mýtinka and Zelený Háj are administrative parts of Vojtanov.

References

Villages in Cheb District